In telecommunications, 6G is the sixth generation mobile system standard currently under development for wireless communications technologies supporting cellular data networks. It is the planned successor to 5G and will likely be significantly faster. Like its predecessors, 6G networks will probably be broadband cellular networks, in which the service area is divided into small geographical areas called cells. Several companies (Airtel, Anritsu, Apple, Ericsson,  Fly, Huawei, Jio, Keysight, LG, Nokia, NTT Docomo, Samsung, Vi, Xiaomi),  research institutes (Technology Innovation Institute, the Interuniversity Microelectronics Centre) and countries (United States, countries in the European Union, Russia, China, India, Japan, South Korea, Singapore and United Arab Emirates) have shown interest in 6G networks.

6G networks are expected to be even more diverse than their predecessors and are likely to support applications beyond current mobile use scenarios, such as virtual and augmented reality (VR/AR), ubiquitous instant communications, pervasive intelligence and the Internet of Things (IoT). It is expected that mobile network operators will adopt flexible decentralized business models for 6G, with local spectrum licensing, spectrum sharing, infrastructure sharing, and intelligent automated management underpinned by mobile edge computing, artificial intelligence (AI), short-packet communication and blockchain technologies.

However, as of January 2023, there is no universally-accepted government or non-government standard for what qualifies as 6G technology.

Terahertz and millimeter wave progress 
Millimeter waves (30 to 300 GHz) and Terahertz radiation (300 to 3000 GHz) might, according to some speculations, be used in 6G. The wave propagation of these frequencies is however much more sensitive to obstacles than the microwave frequencies (about 2 to 30 GHz) used in 5G and Wi-Fi, which are more sensitive than the radio waves used in 1G, 2G, 3G and 4G. 

In October 2020, the Alliance for Telecommunications Industry Solutions (ATIS) launched a "Next G Alliance", an alliance consisting of AT&T, Ericsson, Telus, Verizon, T-Mobile, Microsoft, Samsung, and others that "will advance North American mobile technology leadership in 6G and beyond over the next decade."

In January 2022, Purple Mountain Laboratories of China claimed that its research team had achieved a world record of 206.25 gigabits per second (Gbit/s) data rate for the first time in a lab environment within the terahertz frequency band which is supposed to be the base of 6G cellular technology

In February 2022, Chinese researchers say they have achieved a record data streaming speed using vortex millimetre waves, a form of extremely high-frequency radio wave with rapidly changing spins, the researchers transmitted 1 terabyte of data over a distance of 1 km (3,300 feet) in a second. The spinning potential of radio waves was first reported by British physicist John Henry Poynting in 1909, but making use of it proved to be difficult. Zhang and colleagues said their breakthrough was built on the hard work of many research teams across the globe over the past few decades. Researchers in Europe conducted the earliest communication experiments using vortex waves in the 1990s. A major challenge is that the size of the spinning waves increases with distance, and the weakening signal makes high-speed data transmission difficult. The Chinese team built a unique transmitter to generate a more focused vortex beam, making the waves spin in three different modes to carry more information, and developed a high-performance receiving device that could pick up and decode a huge amount of data in a split second.

Test satellite launch 

On November 6, 2020, China successfully launched an experimental test satellite with candidates for 6G technology into orbit, along with 12 other satellites, using a Long March 6 launch vehicle rocket. The satellite is intended to "verify the terahertz (THz) communication technology in space", according to the Global Times newspaper.

6G networks are expected to be developed and released by 2030.

Expectations 
Recent academic articles have been conceptualizing 6G and new features that may be included. AI is included in many of these predictions, from 6G supporting AI infrastructure to "AI designing and optimizing 6G architectures, protocols, and operations." Another study in Nature Electronics looks to provide a framework for 6G research stating "We suggest that human-centric mobile communications will still be the most important application of 6G and the 6G network should be human-centric. Thus, high security, secrecy and privacy should be key features of 6G and should be given particular attention by the wireless research community."

The question of what frequencies 6G will operate on are still up to interpretation. The Institute of Electrical and Electronics Engineers states that "Frequencies from 100 GHz to 3 THz are promising bands for the next generation of wireless communication systems because of the wide swaths of unused and unexplored spectrum." One of the biggest challenges in supporting the required high transmission speeds will be the limitation of energy/power consumption and associated heat development in the electronic circuits to acceptable proportions.

A book published by Wiley (IEEE series) in December 2021 provides a snapshot of current international thinking on the major 6G research aspects. It states “Besides technologies and services, the business models of mobile communication networks are also evolving and will continue to evolve rapidly in the forthcoming years. Due to the ongoing fixed-mobile network convergence and ICT convergence, future communications will be tightly integrated in enterprise applications. The global rise of 5G campus networks should be considered just the start toward 5G enterprise networking and the emergence of new business models and ecosystems. This also raises questions on the role of international standards and rise of open software stacks paving the way toward a new telecommunications ecosystem, in which virtualized network functions from different developers and providers can be dynamically orchestrated and integrated in a secure, reliable, and energy-efficient manner.”

References

External links 
 

Mobile telecommunications
Internet of things
Data centers
Wireless communication systems
Technology forecasting